Valerio Cassani (28 February 1922 – 23 February 1995) was an Italian professional footballer who played as a midfielder.

Career
Cassani played for 5 seasons (119 games, 20 goals) in the Italian Serie A for Atalanta B.C., Modena F.C., A.S. Livorno Calcio and A.S. Bari. Cassani made his debut for the Italy national football team on 2 August 1948 in the 1948 Summer Olympics, in Italy's game against the United States.

References

External links
 

1922 births
1995 deaths
Italian footballers
Italy international footballers
Serie A players
Olympic footballers of Italy
Footballers at the 1948 Summer Olympics
Calcio Padova players
Atalanta B.C. players
Modena F.C. players
U.S. Livorno 1915 players
S.S.C. Bari players
Genoa C.F.C. players
Association football midfielders